Tactical Knives (ISSN 1079-865X) was a knife magazine that was published six times per year by Harris Publications. The magazine had its headquarters in New York City. It  directly focused on those who actually carry and use knives as opposed to collectors. Typical articles included reviews about knives intended for hunting, hiking, canoeing, wilderness survival, street defense and military combat among other topics.

Publication ceased in September 2014.

References

External links
 Official homepage

Bimonthly magazines published in the United States
Defunct magazines published in the United States
Harris Publications titles
Hobby magazines published in the United States
Magazines established in 1994
Magazines disestablished in 2014
Magazines published in New York City